Þórisjökull or Thórisjökull (Icelandic for "Thóris's glacier") is a small glacier and volcano in western-central Iceland, to the southwest of  Langjökull glacier. Kaldidalur lies in the foreground.

Position

þórisjökull is situated between Langjökull glacier and the shield volcano Ok to its east. The "Cold valley" (translation of Kaldidalur) is lying between them with its famous highland road of the same name.

The volcano
The glacier volcano Þórisjökull is a tuya from the Ice Age (in Iceland from 100,000 years ago til about 10,000 years ago). Its mountain part consists mainly of hyaloclastites. The glacier was part of Langjökull glacier probably til the end of the 18th century.

Some geological research was made again on the Þórisjökull and Prestahnúkur area in 2009 and it shows clearly active volcanic fissures under the glacier which are part of the Prestahnúkur volcanic system (see weblink, Icelandic Meteorological Institute).

The name
The name comes from the name of the troll Þóri (from Grettis Saga) which is said to have been lived in a cave nearby.

Mountaineering

References

External links
Icelandic Meteorological Institute, Prestahnúkur, Nov. 2009, Icelandic with english summary
Geomorphology from Space - NASA (Goddard Space Flight Center)

Þórisjökull
Þórisjökull
Þórisjökull
Þórisjökull
Þórisjökull
Borgarbyggð
Þórisjökull